Dayin is a town in northeastern Zhejiang province, China, located at the northeastern end of the Siming Mountains (四明山)  west of downtown Ningbo and just south of G92 Hangzhou Bay Ring Expressway.

See also 
 List of township-level divisions of Zhejiang

References 

Township-level divisions of Zhejiang